The Independent Workers' Union of Great Britain (IWGB) is a trade union in the United Kingdom. The IWGB comprises eleven branches which organise workers within their chosen industry, run their own campaigns and have their own representative officials. Their members are predominantly low paid migrant workers in London. The IWGB began as a breakaway from Unite and UNISON. The dispute stemmed from disagreements over how to get better working conditions for cleaners at the University of London, and, more broadly, about how to run modern trade unions. The IWGB is one of the main trade unions in challenging employment law relating to the 'gig economy'.

Sectors
The IWGB represents workers in traditionally un-unionised sectors of the "gig economy", including cleaners, couriers and drivers, foster carers, the video games industry, and yoga teachers.

The IWGB is a campaigning union which has waged a number of high-profile campaigns and is notable for its use of direct action and social media to generate widespread publicity and support for them. The General Secretary of the IWGB, Jason Moyer-Lee, has said that the union's aim is to:

"Ramp up the pressure, using social media and by staging loud and disruptive protests, surprise protests and mini-occupations".

Cleaners at University of London

3 Cosas (3 Things) was a campaign led by mostly Latinx outsourced cleaners to improve their working conditions at the University of London. The three demands were for annual leave, sick pay, and adequate pension contributions. The strike was notable for gaining support from Green Party leader Natalie Bennett, and the Labour MPs Jeremy Corbyn, John McDonnell and Andy Burnham. The strike was noted for its 'red balloons, drums, and a sound system that played samba music, as well as workers turning delivery vehicles away from the gates".

Alongside strike action, the IWGB also launched a legal challenge to the University of London over the rights of 75 of their outsourced staff to negotiate their pay and conditions directly with the university itself. The IWGB, with the legal aid of the Good Law Project cited Article 11 of the European Convention on Human Rights to argue that the University's failure to negotiate directly with their de facto employees constituted an infringement on the right to collective bargaining enshrined in the convention. The case was considered a landmark legal challenge, with the potential to revolutionise the rights of outsourced workers in the UK.

In 2017 their outsourced employer  Balfour Beatty Workplace agreed to most of the demands.

Following further strikes in 2017 and 2018, the University of London released a statement in June 2018 declaring that they would begin to bring some of their outsourced staff back in house. Although the statements were vague on timings, some concessions were made to the IWGBs demands, including an acknowledgement that direct action had influenced the decision. Following the statements, the IWGB organised a further strike for 6 June to keep up the pressure on the university for concrete commitments.

Courier and delivery work
The IWGB has argued that 'independent contractors' for Uber, Deliveroo and other delivery firms are in fact employees and has achieved notable court decisions in this area.

Deliveroo

In June 2018 Justice Simler gave the IWGB permission to challenge a 2017 ruling of the Central Arbitration Committee in the High Court, claiming that it was arguable that the CAC should have considered the rights of Deliveroo riders to bargain collectively as enshrined in Article 11 of the European Convention on Human Rights. The IWGB has so far raised just short of £25000 to cover the legal costs of the case. In a separate case, the IWGB assisted Deliveroo couriers in Brighton after they spontaneously protested over a lack of work. The IWGB demanded that Deliveroo implement a hiring freeze, as well as an increase in payment for deliveries from £4 to £5. Following these actions, Deliveroo wrote a letter to their couriers in Brighton stating that they would implement a hiring freeze, unrelated to the demands made by the IWGB.

Dewhurst v CitySprint
The IWGB supported Mags Dewhurst's Employment Tribunal against CitySprint. This considered whether the claimant was a worker of CitySprint as opposed to being self-employed or a 'contractor'.

The IWGB and Ms. Dewhurst were successful and the Employment Tribunal found that Ms. Dewhurst should be classed as a worker rather than self-employed. The Employment Tribunal labelled the contract as 'contorted', 'indecipherable', and 'window dressing', and noted that 'CitySprint ... has the power to regulate the amount of work available and it keeps its couriers busy by limiting the size of the fleet'.

The IWGB said this should be seen as a 'test case' and called for the decision to be rolled out across all of CitySprint's employees. CitySprint, who have a network of 3,500 couriers, disputed the verdict and the IWGB's claims stating that:

In a later Employment Tribunal case, after CitySprint's courier contract for HCA Healthcare had been transferred to Revisecatch Ltd t/a Ecourier, the tribunal found that as 'workers' Ms Dewhurst and others enjoyed rights under TUPE legislation.

Boxer v Excel
The IWGB supported cycle courier Andrew Boxer's Employment Tribunal against employer Excel Group Services Ltd. He argued that he was entitled to one week of holiday pay based on his work for Excel, which amounted to £321.16. Mr Boxer worked 9 hours a day, 5 days a week and had no opportunity to negotiate his pay rate or to provide someone else to do work on his behalf. When asked about his contract Mr Boxer said: "I had no choice, it would not have made a difference, they would have laughed at me if I had challenged a particular clause"

Judge Joanna Wade, who presided over the Employment Tribunal, said that she classified Boxer as a worker, and not an independent contractor. She said that the contract that Boxer signed "did not reflect the reality of the situation... the inequality of bargaining power at this point was very notable". Excel did not provide witness evidence or attend the tribunal hearing. The firm initially offered to pay the claim for holiday pay "without acceptance of the claimant's claim". This was rejected by Mr Boxer.

eCourier admittal of wrongful classification
eCourier admitted to wrongly denying employment benefits to one of their couriers, IWGB member Demille Flanore, after incorrectly classifying him as an independent contractor rather than employee. The admittal came in response to an employment tribunal claim made by Flanore to contest his status – rather than contest the case, eCourier chose instead to admit their wrongdoing. The event was described as 'a major sea change' by the IWGB, reflecting the changing landscape of the gig economy.

IWGB v Addison Lee
IWGB supported the case of cycle courier Chris Gascoigne in a case against his employer, Addison Lee, in August 2017. Following similar rulings in other IWGB supported cases against Excel, CitySprint, Uber and eCourier, employment Judge Joanna Wade ruled that Gascoigne was to be considered a 'worker' and not a 'self-employed contractor' as Addison Lee had alleged. Jason Moyer-Lee described the case as another 'domino' within the changing law around the gig-economy, signifying progress in the IWGBs aim to ramp up the pressure against these employers.

Aslam v Uber BV

The IWGB took over an employment tribunal case against Uber in 2017 on behalf of two of 2 Uber drivers, James Farrar and Yaseen Aslam, The remainder of the claimants stayed with GMB union. Prior to an appeal of the case that they had begun the year before. The case rested on Farrar and Aslam's claims that their classification by Uber as self-employed 'partners' was a sham, and that they should, in fact be classed as workers, entitling them to minimum wage and a whole host of other employment rights.

The Tribunal concluded that Farrar and Aslam were indeed workers, and were accordingly entitled to both minimum wage and holiday pay. The Tribunal found that Uber was to be regarded as an employer, saying that the idea that the company was a:

“mosaic of 30,000 small businesses linked by a common ‘platform’ is to our minds faintly ridiculous.”

Uber appealed the decision, but their appeal was dismissed in November 2017, and a further appeal to the Court of Appeal was likewise dismissed in December 2018. Uber were, however granted permission for a final appeal to the Supreme Court. Aslam and Farrar were chair and secretary of the Private Hire Drivers Branch of the IWGB. In an interview on BBC Breakfast in November 2017 Farrar noted the role of the IWGB in the case, saying:

"the IWGB union has become the de facto union for the gig economy. We've got their support - they've been behind us 100% of the way."

In February 2020, Yaseen Aslam, James Farrar and the entire national executive committee of the IWGB private hire drivers branch voted unanimously to leave the IWGB to set up the App Drivers & Couriers Union (ADCU). From that point, the ADCU took control over the Aslam v Uber case and in July 2020, the App Drivers & Couriers Union defended against Uber's final appeal in the case at the UK Supreme Court - the highest court in the land. The IWGB has no further involvement in the case. The App Drivers & Couriers Union is an independent trade union which focuses on the particular needs of drivers & couriers in the gig economy where their work is digitally mediated.

The Doctors Laboratory collective bargaining agreement
In March 2018, the IWGB became the first union to be recognised within the gig-economy for collective bargaining. The ruling came within a campaign the IWGB was organising with couriers at The Doctors Laboratory (TDL), a private courier service that works with the NHS to provide delivery services. For many months, TDL refused to recognise the IWGB, before the Central Arbitration Committee ruled on the case, obliging TDL to recognise the union as representative of the couriers. Previous to the ruling, the IWGB had secured full employment rights for a number of their members at TDL.

Actions with Gina Miller

Article 50 Supreme Court intervention
The IWGB also intervened in the R (Miller) v Secretary of State for Exiting the European Union case. The IWGB intervened on the grounds that the UK's decision to leave the EU necessitates a debate in Parliament because the UK's decision to leave the EU directly affects its members. The IWGB were allowed to provide a written submission of up to a maximum of 20 pages, and will seek the opportunity to present a brief oral submission of no more than 45 minutes, on issues surrounding the UK's decision to leave the EU.

Legal Letter on £1 billion DUP Deal
In September 2017, the IWGB co-penned a legal letter to the government, claiming that they were required to seek parliamentary approval for £1 billion spending in Northern Ireland under the Conservative–DUP agreement. The IWGB acted on behalf of their members, with Jason Moyer-Lee claiming that:

Following the letter, the government announced that they would be seeking parliamentary approval before the release of these funds to Northern Ireland.

References

External links
Official website
2013 establishments in the United Kingdom
Precarious workers' trade unions
Progressive International
Trade unions established in 2013
Trade unions in the United Kingdom